America Give Up is the debut studio album by American indie rock band Howler. The album was released on January 16, 2012, by Rough Trade Records.

On NME'''s top 50 albums of 2012, America Give Up'' was listed at #20.

Track listing 
All songs written by Howler, except track 9 written by Howler and Steve Cruze.

Music videos
The video for "Back of Your Neck" was released on YouTube under RoughTradeRecordsUK's account. It clocks at 3:11. The video mainly shows Howler "mucking about" in Minneapolis, filmed by a quite grainy camera. The only other really different scene is of Howler playing the song in a studio, mainly concentrating on Jordan. This footage seems to be made for the actual promo. There is a behind the scenes video on NME.com that was released before the actual video for "Back of Your Neck"
It was directed by Robert Semmer and despite the fact that it was the shortened, edited, version of the song, the lyrics "but both of them fucking died" and "smoking as high as a crackpot" are uncensored.

Charts

References 

2012 debut albums
Howler (band) albums
Rough Trade Records albums